Yancarraman, located at , is a civil parish of Evelyn County, New South Wales, Australia.

The parish has a Köppen climate classification of BWh (Hot desert).

The parish is on the traditional lands of Yarli peoples.

References

Parishes of Evelyn County
Far West (New South Wales)
Localities in New South Wales